Pterolobium punctatum is a flowering plant in the family Fabaceae.

References

punctatum